Lee Bo-Na (born July 22, 1981) is a female South Korean sports shooter who competed in the 2004 Summer Olympics.

She won the silver medal in the women's double trap competition and the bronze medal in the women's trap competition.

External links
 profile

1981 births
Living people
South Korean female sport shooters
Olympic shooters of South Korea
Shooters at the 2004 Summer Olympics
Shooters at the 2008 Summer Olympics
Olympic silver medalists for South Korea
Olympic bronze medalists for South Korea
Trap and double trap shooters
Olympic medalists in shooting
Asian Games medalists in shooting
Shooters at the 2006 Asian Games
Shooters at the 2010 Asian Games
Shooters at the 2014 Asian Games
Medalists at the 2004 Summer Olympics
Asian Games gold medalists for South Korea
Asian Games silver medalists for South Korea
Asian Games bronze medalists for South Korea
Medalists at the 2006 Asian Games
Medalists at the 2010 Asian Games
Medalists at the 2014 Asian Games
Shooters at the 2018 Asian Games
20th-century South Korean women
21st-century South Korean women